Hill Township is a township in Kittson County, Minnesota, United States. The population was 18 at the 2000 census.

Hill Township was organized in 1901, and named for James J. Hill, a railroad official.

Geography

Demographics
As of the census of 2000, there were 18 people, 7 households, and 7 families residing in the township. The population density was 0.6 people per square mile (0.2/km2). There were 10 housing units at an average density of 0.3/sq mi (0.1/km2). The racial makeup of the township was 100.00% White.

There were 7 households, out of which 28.6% had children under the age of 18 living with them, 100.0% were married couples living together, and 0.0% were non-families. No households were made up of individuals, and none had someone living alone who was 65 years of age or older. The average household size was 2.57 and the average family size was 2.57.

In the township the population was spread out, with 11.1% under the age of 18, 11.1% from 18 to 24, 44.4% from 25 to 44, 11.1% from 45 to 64, and 22.2% who were 65 years of age or older. The median age was 40 years. For every 100 females, there were 157.1 males. For every 100 females age 18 and over, there were 128.6 males.

The median income for a household in the township was $34,167, and the median income for a family was $34,167. Males had a median income of $46,250 versus $0 for females. The per capita income for the township was $9,814.  About 16.7% of families and 27.3% of the population were below the poverty line, including 50.0% of those under 18 and none of those over 64.

References

Townships in Kittson County, Minnesota
Townships in Minnesota